John Kiarie Waweru is a Kenyan politician. He is a member of Parliament for Dagoretti South Constituency in Nairobi County under [[United Democratic Alliance
Political party]]. and former Redkyulass Comedian. He is popularly known as KJ from the popular show Redkyulass. He also ran a comedy cartoon strip from Sunday Nation Buzz Magazine.

Early years and education 
Kiarie was born in 1978. He  attended  Kileleshwa Primary School  for his primary education and Dagoretti High School. He later joined  Jomo Kenyatta University of Agriculture and Technology and acquired Certificate in Information Technology in 1996. He obtained a Bachelor of Education from Kenyatta University. Prior to entering to politics he was  a Journalist at Nation Media Group  and  a Director for Redykulass Limited.

Professional Life 
Kiarie worked was a teacher in Materi Girls Center and State House Girls High School before becoming a Columnist Journalist for the Nation Media. He left Nation Media Group to join Ogilvy Africa as an Art Director in 2008. In 2011, he joined Scanad as a Communications Consultant. Kiarie served as a Director at the Youth Agenda between 2003 and 2008. went on to serve as a Director at the Athi Water Services Board between 2008 and 2011.

Political life and career 
Kiarie was elected as the member of parliament for Dagoretti South in 2017 under the Jubilee Party of Kenya, where he finished first ahead of five other candidates. As a member of serves in the 12th Kenyan parliament  and is in charge of the NG-CDF for Dagoretti South and is a member of Departmental Committee on Communication, Information & Innovation and Departmental Committee on justice and Legal Affairs in since 2017 to date.

See also 
 Dagoretti South Constituency
 Parliament of Kenya

References 

1978 births
Living people
Members of the 12th Parliament of Kenya
Members of the 13th Parliament of Kenya
21st-century Kenyan politicians
United Democratic Alliance (Kenya) politicians